Kaela is the first album released by Japanese pop singer Kaela Kimura. It was released on December 8, 2004, and peaked at number seven on the Japanese charts. It features the singles, "Level 42" (released June 23, 2004) and "Happiness!!!" (released October 27, 2004).

Track listing

References

2004 albums
Kaela Kimura albums
Japanese-language albums